The Book of Squares, (Liber Quadratorum in the original Latin) is a book on algebra by Leonardo Fibonacci, published in 1225. It was dedicated to Frederick II, Holy Roman Emperor.

The Liber quadratorum has been passed down by a single 15th-century manuscript, the so-called ms. E 75 Sup. of the Biblioteca Ambrosiana (Milan, Italy), ff. 19r-39v. During the 19th century, the work has been published for the first time in a printed edition by Baldassarre Boncompagni Ludovisi, prince of Piombino.

Appearing in the book is Fibonacci's identity, establishing that the set of all sums of two squares is closed under multiplication. The book anticipated the works of later mathematicians such as Fermat and Euler.

Notes

Further reading
 B. Boncompagni Ludovisi, Opuscoli di Leonardo Pisano secondo un codice della Biblioteca Ambrosiana di Milano contrassegnato E.75. Parte Superiore, in Id., Scritti di Leonardo Pisano matematico del secolo decimoterzo, vol. II, Roma 1862, pp. 253–283
 P. Ver Eecke, Léonard de Pise. Le livre des nombres carrés. Traduit pour la première fois du Latin Médiéval en Français, Paris, Blanchard-Desclée - Bruges 1952.
 G. Arrighi, La fortuna di Leonardo Pisano alla corte di Federico II, in Dante e la cultura sveva. Atti del Convegno di Studi, Melfi, 2-5 novembre 1969, Firenze 1970, pp. 17–31.
 E. Picutti, Il Libro dei quadrati di Leonardo Pisano e i problemi di analisi indeterminata nel Codice Palatino 557 della Biblioteca Nazionale di Firenze, in «Physis. Rivista Internazionale di Storia della Scienza» XXI, 1979, pp. 195–339.
 L.E. Sigler, Leonardo Pisano Fibonacci, the book of squares. An annotated translation into modern English, Boston 1987.
 M. Moyon, Algèbre & Practica geometriæ en Occident médiéval latin: Abū Bakr, Fibonacci et Jean de Murs, in Pluralité de l’algèbre à la Renaissance, a cura di S. Rommevaux, M. Spiesser, M.R. Massa Esteve, Paris 2012, pp. 33–65.

External links
Fibonacci and Square Numbers at 

1225 books
13th-century Latin books
Mathematics books
Squares in number theory